The Blue Mountain Echo, also published as The Blue Mountain Star, The Katoomba Daily, The Blue Mountains Daily, and The Blue Mountains Echo was a semi-weekly English language newspaper published in Katoomba, New South Wales, Australia.

History
The paper, published from 1909-1939, changed names several times in its history. 

The paper was initially published under the management of James C. Hart of Mountaineer Printing and Publishing Company. Following his retirement, Robert Villiers Smythe took over management and remained with the paper as editor until November 1928. With new management came a change of name, as the paper was published from 1929 as The Blue Mountain Star.

The Blue Mountain Star was edited by Victor Yeoman Mathias during its brief publication history, before it was absorbed into the Katoomba Daily in 1932. First published in 1920, in its early years the Katoomba Daily had been printed and published by Robert Clyde Packer before printing moved to Katoomba in 1924. Other editors included Austin Mays, Sydney Lochlan Ward and Edmund Joseph Collins.

The paper changed name twice in 1939, first to the Blue Mountains Daily in February and then in May to the Blue Mountains Echo, which ceased publication shortly afterwards.

Digitisation
The Blue Mountain Echo has been digitised as part of the Australian Newspapers Digitisation Program project of the National Library of Australia.

See also
List of newspapers in New South Wales
List of newspapers in Australia

References

External links
 
 
 
 

Defunct newspapers published in Katoomba, New South Wales
Newspapers on Trove